Clube de Regatas do Flamengo (English: Flamengo Rowing Club), more commonly referred to as simply Flamengo, is a Brazilian sports club based in Rio de Janeiro, in the neighborhood of Gávea, best known for their professional football team that plays in Campeonato Brasileiro Série A, as well as Campeonato Carioca.

The club was first established in 1895 specifically as a rowing club and did not play their first official football match until 1912. Flamengo's traditional uniform features red and black striped shirts with white shorts, and red and black striped socks. Flamengo has typically played their home matches in the Maracanã, the national stadium of Brazil, since its completion in 1950, with some exceptions in recent years. Since 1969, the vulture (Portuguese: urubu) has been the most recognized mascot of Flamengo.

Flamengo established themselves as one of Brazil's most successful sports clubs in the 20th century during the era of state leagues in Brazil when they captured several Campeonato Carioca (Rio de Janeiro state league) titles prior to the establishment of the first Brazilian national football championship in 1959. Since then, they have remained successful in Brazilian football, having won 7 Campeonato Brasileiro Série A, the 1987 Copa União, 4 Copa do Brasil, and a record 37 Campeonato Carioca. They are one of three clubs to have never been relegated from the Brazilian Serie A. In South American and worldwide competitions, the club's highest achievements are their conquests of the 1981, 2019 and 2022 Copa Libertadores, and 1981 Intercontinental Cup against Liverpool, led by the club's most iconic player Zico. Flamengo's fiercest and longest-standing rivalries are with the other "Big Four" of Rio de Janeiro: Fluminense, Botafogo and Vasco da Gama. Their rivalry against Atlético Mineiro is considered the fiercest among all interstates rivalries by any clubs in the country.

Flamengo is the most popular club in Brazil, with over 40.2 million supporters as of 2020. It is also Brazil's richest and most valuable football club with an annual revenue of R$950.0 million (€163.04 million) and a valuation of over R$2.9 billion (€469.21 million).

History

Establishment of the club (1895–1912) 
Flamengo was founded on November 17, 1895, by a group of rowers gathered at club member Nestor de Barros's manor on Flamengo Beach in Rio de Janeiro. In the late 19th century, rowing was the elite, upper middle class sport in the region and the group hoped to impress the young women of the city's high society by establishing a rowing club. Previously, they could only afford a used boat named Pherusa, which had to be completely rebuilt before it could be used in competition. The team debuted on October 6, 1895, when they sailed off the Caju Point toward Flamengo Beach. However, strong winds turned over the boat and the rowers nearly drowned. They were rescued by a fishing boat named Leal (Loyal). Later as the Pherusa was undergoing repairs, it was stolen and never found again. The group saved money to buy a new boat, the Etoile, renamed Scyra.

On the night of November 17, the group gathered at Nestor de Barros's manor on Flamengo beach and founded the Grupo de Regatas do Flamengo (English: Flamengo Rowing Group) and elected its first board and president (Domingos Marques de Azevedo). The name was changed a few weeks later to its current title of Clube de Regatas do Flamengo (Flamengo Rowing Club). The founders decided that the anniversary of the club's foundation should be commemorated on November 15 to coincide with Republic Proclamation Day, a national holiday.

Flamengo's football team was only established after a group of ten dissatisfied players from Fluminense broke away from that club following a dispute with its board. The players decided to join Flamengo because Alberto Borgerth, the team's captain, was also a rower for Flamengo. Also, establishing a land sports department at Flamengo was preferable to joining football rivals Botafogo or the all-English club Paissandu. The new members were admitted on November 8, 1911. A motion against the club taking part in football tournaments was put to a vote but was defeated, and as a result the members officially established the club's new football department on December 24, 1911.

Football in the amateur era (1912–1933) 

The first official match was played on May 3, 1912, and marked, to this day, the largest margin of victory in the club's history, as they defeated Mangueira 16–2. Flamengo's first ever match against Fluminense, the start of the Fla-Flu rivalry, was played on July 7 of that year and was won by Fluminense by a score of 3–2. That same year, Flamengo finished as runners-up of the Campeonato Carioca, the Rio de Janeiro State Championship. The team's first uniform was nicknamed the "papagaio vintém", due to its similarity to a particular type of kite. In 1914 the club won the Campeonato Carioca for the first time, dressed in a red, black, and white-striped shirt nicknamed the "cobra coral" (coral snake) was worn until 1916. Flamengo won the Campeonato Carioca again in 1915, 1920, and 1921.

In 1925, the team won the Campeonato Carioca and five other tournaments, a record at the time. In 1927 the prominent Rio newspaper Jornal do Brasil, in partnership with a mineral water company, held a mail-in contest to find "the most beloved club in Brazil." Though Flamengo enjoyed their largest increase in fan support after the club professionalized in the 1930s, they still defeated popular rivals Vasco da Gama in the vote. This was the first of many times that Flamengo would be polled as the nation's most popular club, originating the nickname "O mais querido do Brasil" ("the most beloved of Brazil"). In 1933 the team went on its first tour outside Brazil (to Montevideo and Buenos Aires) and on May 14 of the same year played its final match as an amateur team, defeating River Futebol Clube by a score of 16–2. After this, the club's football department became professional.

Early professional era (1934–1955) 

Local advertiser José Bastos Padilha was elected club president in 1934 and served until 1937. Under his tenure, the club massively improved its popularity in both Rio de Janeiro and the entirety of Brazil. For publicity, he organized a contest for students in schools to create phrases describing Flamengo, from which the phrase uma vez Flamengo, Flamengo até morrer ("Once you are Flamengo, you are Flamengo 'til you die") was developed and would later be adopted as part of the club's anthem. In 1936 Padilha signed excellent players such as Domingos da Guia and Leônidas da Silva (who would go on to be the leading goalscorer in the 1938 FIFA World Cup as a Flamengo player). These beloved players endeared Flamengo to the public and it is believed that by this time Flamengo was the most popular club in the country. In 1937 Flamengo hired Hungarian coach Izidor "Dori" Kürschner, who introduced the WM system to Brazil and other innovations from Europe such as training without the use of the ball and playing a more defensive, controlled style. Padilha facilitated the construction of Flamengo's new stadium and current training center, the Estádio da Gávea. The stadium was inaugurated on September 4, 1938, when Vasco da Gama defeated Flamengo 2–0 and Kürschner was promptly fired.

In 1938, the five-year split in Rio de Janeiro football over the dispute between professionalism and amateurism was resolved with the merger of the two competing leagues (Flamengo had been a member of the professional LCF - Liga Carioca de Football). In 1939, after twelve years without winning any titles, Flamengo conquered the state championship with a team that would become the basis of the three-time state champions in the 1940s.

In 1941, the group played its first international competition, the Hexagonal Tournament of Argentina. In 1942, the first organized supporters group in all of Brazil, Charanga Rubro-Negra, was founded in support of Flamengo. Flamengo's popularity grew incidentally during World War II when Brazil's allies the United States installed two high-powered antennas in Natal and Belém in the north of Brazil to intercept enemy radio signals. They also allowed residents in the North and Northeast regions to receive the radio broadcasts of football matches. As Rio de Janeiro was the national capital at the time and Flamengo was highly successful in the war years with Zizinho and Domingos da Guia, nationwide support increased. In 1944, Flamengo completed their first tricampeonato Carioca: three consecutive Rio de Janeiro state titles (winning the 1942, 1943, and 1944 competitions). The key player of this squad was Zizinho, a player developed at Flamengo and considered the first ever "idol" of the club. Zizinho was transferred to Bangu just before the start of the 1950 World Cup in Brazil, where he scored twice and the Seleção finished runners-up. From 1953 to 1955, Flamengo once again won the Rio de Janeiro State League three consecutive times.

Zico and the world champions (1974–1983) 

Flamengo won their 18th Campeonato Carioca state championship in 1978. The following five years would come to represent the club's most glorious era. Brazilian stars like Júnior, Carpegiani, Adílio, Cláudio Adão and Tita were led by Zico to become state champions three times in a row - the club's third tri-championship. This run of sustained excellent play pushed Flamengo towards its first Brazilian Championship in 1980. As national champions, the club qualified to play in the South American continental tournament, the 1981 Copa Libertadores, for the first time.

The 1981 season is a benchmark year in Flamengo's history. They advanced through the semi-final group stage of the Copa Libertadores with four victories in four matches. In the final they encountered Chilean club Cobreloa, also a debutante club in the tournament. In the first final at the Maracanã, Flamengo prevailed (2–1) with two goals from Zico. In the National Stadium in Santiago the following week, the Brazilian team received a violent reception on the field and fell 1–0 from a free kick. Equal on goals, a third match was played at the neutral venue of the Estadio Centenario in Montevideo. Zico scored twice in the first half, sealing the game and the championship. Flamengo were crowned champions of South America on November 23 and qualified for the Intercontinental Cup, a single match to be played in Tokyo's Olympic Stadium against European Champions' Cup winner Liverpool FC.

On December 13, 1981, Zico, Tita, and Nunes took the field for the most important match in the club's history. Two goals by Nunes and one by Adílio (all in the first half) along with a brilliant midfield performance by Zico earned Flamengo the title of first Brazilian World Champions since Pelé's Santos, shutting out Liverpool 3–0.

The following two years were also marked with success. One more Rio de Janeiro State Championship in 1981 and two Brazilian Championships – 1982 and 1983 – closed Flamengo's "Golden Age."

National success and the return of Zico (1984–1994) 

After two years playing in Italy for Udinese, Zico returned to the Flamengo in 1986 and won his last state championship. Only one month after returning, he suffered a severe knee injury after a violent tackle from Bangu defender Marcio Nunes, which interrupted his career for several months and affected his form in the 1986 FIFA World Cup.

In 1987, Zico was a major contributor to Flamengo's victory in the first edition of the Copa União. That year, the CBF was experiencing serious financial and institutional crises and was unable to secure sponsorship to organize the national championship as in years prior. As a result, the thirteen biggest clubs in Brazil (which included Flamengo) reacted and created a new entity named the Club of 13 to organize a championship of their own. The CBF originally supported the decision by the Club of 13, but were pressured by other clubs to create a larger national tournament. As a result, CBF placed three additional clubs into the Copa União, regarded the Copa União as the "Green Module," and organized a second "Yellow Module" of 16 other teams. CBF then decided that for the 1987 Brazilian Championship, the winners and runners-up of both modules would face each other in a knockout-style cup to determine the national champion and qualification for the Copa Libertadores, although this decision was made after the beginning of the championship, without Club of 13 agreement. With strong performances from Zico, Zé Carlos, Renato Gaúcho and Bebeto, Flamengo conquered the Copa União with major victories over Internacional and Atlético Mineiro. However, there was a dispute over whether Flamengo and Internacional of the Green Module would dispute the quadrangular against Sport Recife and Guarani of the Yellow Module. The Club of 13 clubs had agreed to not participate in the final set up by the CBF, since it was decided while the matches were already being played, but Eurico Miranda, a representative of Vasco, Flamengo's archi-rival and member of the Club of 13, had already signed an agreement with CBF regarding the final, without the board consent. Flamengo still did not participate in the final under the understanding that it would only determine the entrants of the Copa Libertadores and not the Brazilian national champion. CBF officially recognized Sport as the sole champion in 1987 and they qualified to the Copa Libertadores. In 2011, CBF retroactively declared Flamengo champion of 1987. However, Sport later appealed the decision to a Common Justice Tribunal, which is prohibited by FIFA, and CBF ultimately declared Sport as the sole champion of that year.

Throughout his career at Flamengo, Zico scored 508 goals and was the top scorer in club history before retiring in 1990.

Even without its biggest star, the early years of the post-Zico era were successful for Flamengo. They achieved national victory in the second edition of the Copa do Brasil in 1990, defeating Goiás in the finals. In 1992, Flamengo won their fifth Campeonato Brasileiro, defeating Botafogo across two legs in the final (3–0, 2–2). The team's key player was again Júnior at 38 years old.

Title drought (1995–2005) 
After winning the Brazilian League title in 1992, the club entered a major financial crisis and domestic and international achievements became less frequent. In 1995, the year of Flamengo's centenary, radio sports broadcaster Kléber Leite became chairman of the club and signed striker Romário, the current FIFA World Player of the Year, from Barcelona. He joined Sávio and later Edmundo to become, as the supporters called, "the attack of dreams". Even with Romário and other stars, Flamengo's centennial year did not yield major trophies. Flamengo only won the Taça Guanabara, the first phase of the Rio de Janeiro State League. Flamengo also finished runners-up of 1995 Supercopa Libertadores. However, in 1996, Flamengo went undefeated in the Campeonato Carioca, conquering both the Taça Guanabara and Taça Rio phases. Romário was the top scorer of the tournament. Sávio was the top scorer and best player in Flamengo's victorious 1996 Copa de Oro campaign. The Copa de Oro was Flamengo's first international success since 1981, their third overall international title.

In 1999, Edmundo dos Santos Silva was elected club president, and brought with him a massive contract with sports marketing company ISL. Despite poor campaigns in the Campeonato Brasileiro, Flamengo won the 1999 Copa Mercosur, the second-tier cup of South America, and continued to be successful at the regional level, winning the treble in state championships (1999-2000-2001) for the fourth time as well the 2001 Copa dos Campeões inter-state title. In 2001 league play, Flamengo avoided relegation to the Brazilian Série B by winning against Palmeiras in the final match of the tournament. The club suffered a series of bad campaigns in the national league in the following years.

ISL went bankrupt in 2002 for reasons unrelated to their contract with Flamengo, and the club was left without its wealthy partner. In the same year, Edmundo Santos Silva was removed from his role as president in a controversial manner amidst accusation of impropriety. Lacking the funds to make key signings, Flamengo failed to field competitive teams and narrowly avoided relegation in the 2002, 2004, and 2005 campaigns. 2005 was one of the worst seasons in Flamengo's history. The club only escaped relegation after the arrival of coach Joel Santana, who directed the team to six wins and three draws in nine matches played under his command. Twice in this low period, in 2003 and 2004, the team reached the finals of the Copa do Brasil, ultimately falling to Cruzeiro and Santo André.

End of title drought (2006–2018) 

In 2006, Flamengo reached the Copa do Brasil final for a fifth time, finally managing to conquer the title after losing three previous finals, this time beating rivals Vasco da Gama. From 2007 to 2009 Flamengo completed their fifth tricampeonato in the Campeonato Carioca, and became sole owners of the record for most Carioca titles with 31 (Fluminense had 30 at the time).

On 9 March 2007, Flamengo received a commemorative date on the Rio de Janeiro official calendar. Governor Sérgio Cabral Filho declared 17 November (the day the club was founded) "Flamengo Day".

In the 2007 Campeonato Brasileiro Série A, Flamengo won many games at home, avoided the relegation zone and climbed to second place before being defeated by Náutico 1–0 in the final round and ultimately ending the season third. This marked a dramatic improvement in league outcome from previous seasons. Flamengo finished fifth the following year, and in 2009 despite being in tenth place in midseason, Flamengo won the league after seventeen years. With this victory Flamengo became five-time Campeonato Brasileiro Série A champions, seventeen seasons after their last title in 1992. The 2009 championship team finished the season with 67 points, the lowest winning point total in Brazil since the current league format was established in 2003. Flamengo were champions despite spending only two rounds at the top of the league: the final two. The title was won after a dramatic 2–1 comeback victory against Grêmio in the final round.

International success continued to elude Flamengo through the 21st century. After finishing runners-up in the 2001 Copa Mercosur to San Lorenzo on penalties, the club survived as far the quarter-finals only one time in their following twelve competitions (both Copa Libertadores and Copa Sudamericana). In 2008, in Flamengo's first official tournament tie against a club from Mexico, they defeated Club América 4–2 in the Estadio Azteca before losing polemically 3–0 at home and being eliminated in the Copa Libertadores round of 16.

Flamengo experienced a poor run in Série A from 2010 to 2015, finishing better than tenth only once. Following the success of 2009, the club gambled on winning several titles and signed striker Vágner Love to form a pair with Adriano. The dream of repeating as state champions four times in a row was foiled by Botafogo in 2010. After narrowly qualifying out of the group stage in the Copa Libertadores, manager Andrade was still fired. In their first quarter-final appearance since 1993, Flamengo were eliminated by Universidad de Chile on away goals. Shortly after, Vágner Love and Adriano left the team. A series of coaching changes during the troublesome domestic league saw Flamengo survive relegation and claim the final berth to the Copa Sudamericana under manager Vanderlei Luxemburgo.

The blockbuster signing of 2011 was 30-year-old superstar Ronaldinho from A.C. Milan. He was joined by Argentine Darío Bottinelli and Fluminense idol Thiago Neves. Flamengo won the Campeonato Carioca outright in an undefeated campaign, but captured no other trophies that season: eliminations in the Copa do Brasil by Ceará, a heavy 5–0 loss in the Sudamericana by Universidad de Chile, and a fourth-place finish in the league left fans feeling that a strong roster had been squandered. The season saw the retirement of Serbian club idol Dejan Petković as well. In 2012 Ronaldinho sued Flamengo claiming lack of payment for four months and canceled his contract with the club, Thiago Neves returned to Fluminense after a drawn-out negotiation with contract-holders Al-Hilal, and defender Alex Silva was loaned to Cruzeiro after threatening Flamengo with a lawsuit. Vágner Love and Ibson returned for a 2012 campaign that yielded no trophies and a group-stage exit from the Copa Libertadores.

At the end of 2012, Flamengo elected Eduardo Bandeira de Mello as club president for three years. The goal of his term was to improve the club's finances, after an independent audit assessed Flamengo's debt at R$750 million. After a typical series of managerial changes, Jayme de Almeida was appointed as interim manager during which he fought off relegation and won the 2013 Copa do Brasil final against Atlético Paranaense. It was Flamengo's third Copa title, after 1990 and 2006.

Flamengo's Copa do Brasil title-defense fell short to Atlético Mineiro in the semi-final. However, by 2014, Flamengo was the only club that successfully reduced their debt over the year (down to R$600 million) and recorded the highest annual profit. In 2015 after an inconsistent start to the Carioca and national league seasons, multiple managers were dismissed and Flamengo failed to qualify for the Libertadores. However, Flamengo had signed Paolo Guerrero and Ederson and were the most valuable club in Brazil with debt now reduced to R$495 million. As a result, president Bandeira was re-elected. The club signed fan-favorite Diego in the mid-season and mounted a strong campaign, but could not catch Palmeiras in 2016.

2017 was characterized as the year Flamengo played two major finals at the end of the season but failed to win either. After going undefeated in the 2017 Campeonato Carioca, they were eliminated in the Copa Libertadores group stage, failing to win a single match away from home but qualifying for the Copa Sudamericana in third place. In the Copa do Brasil, the club reached the final where they lost in a penalty shootout to Cruzeiro. Less than three months later, they reached an unprecedented Copa Sudamericana final. They lost away to Independiente and drew at home 1–1, losing the title. After the match, a group of Flamengo supporters rioted outside the hotel where Independiente were staying. CONMEBOL punished the club with two closed-door home matches in the following Copa Libertadores.

Nine years after their last Campeonato Brasileiro victory, Flamengo made a title run but fell just short. In 2018 they spent the most rounds as league leader (thirteen) and broke their points record from 2016 (72), but finished runners-up behind Palmeiras. That season, the club recorded their two highest outgoing transfer fees in history: 18-year-old winger Vinícius Júnior moved to Real Madrid in July for €46 million, and 20-year-old midfielder Lucas Paquetá transferred to A.C. Milan for a reported €35 million at the end of the year. Both were products of Flamengo's youth academy.

New glory (2019–present) 

On the morning of 8 February 2019 a fire erupted at Flamengo's Ninho do Urubu training center living quarters. The fire resulted in the deaths of ten academy players between the ages of 14 and 17 training with the club. Three others were injured. The cause of the fire was a malfunctioning air-conditioning unit that caught fire in the room of one of the victims close to 5:00 am. President Rodolfo Landim described it as "the worst tragedy the club has ever experienced in its 123 years." The governor of the state of Rio de Janeiro declared a three-day period of mourning following the tragedy. Since then, Flamengo fans sing in memory of those kids, usually referred to as the "Garotos do Ninho". It happens every tenth minute of Flamengo home games, since 10 kids unfortunately died in the tragedy.

The 2019 season marked the most successful one in the club's footballing history. At the end of 2018, Rodolfo Landim was elected club president for a three-year term. Flamengo paid the most expensive incoming transfer fee for a player in Brazilian football history, signing Giorgian de Arrascaeta from Cruzeiro for R$63 million (€14.5 million). In January the club signed forward Bruno Henrique from Santos and secured the loan of striker Gabriel Barbosa from Inter Milan.

After advancing out of the Copa Libertadores group stage, manager Abel Braga resigned and Flamengo hired Portuguese manager Jorge Jesus. Europe-based players Rafinha, Filipe Luís, Pablo Marí and Gerson were added to play alongside Flamengo's other record signings. After qualifying to their first Copa Libertadores semi-final since 1984, Flamengo defeated Grêmio 5–0 in their home leg at the Maracanã to advance their first Copa Libertadores final since 1981. For the first time in Copa Libertadores history, the final was played as a single match in a neutral venue. On 23 November 2019, at the Estadio Monumental in Lima, Peru against defending champions River Plate, Flamengo trailed 0–1 in the final minutes before Gabriel scored twice to secure the 2–1 victory.

Less than 24 hours later, Flamengo became champions of the Campeonato Brasileiro Série A for the first time since 2009 with four matches in hand after a loss by Palmeiras to Grêmio in the 34th round. Flamengo became only the second Brazilian club to win their state championship (2019 Campeonato Carioca), Campeonato Brasileiro, and Copa Libertadores in the same season, after Pelé's 1962 Santos team. Flamengo's 2019 campaign under Jorge Jesus' leadership broke a number of records in the Campeonato Brasileiro's 20-team double round-robin era (2006–present): most points (90), most wins (28), most goals scored (86), best goal differential (+49), longest undefeated streak (24 matches), most points clear of runners-up (16) and most goals by a single player (25 from Gabriel Barbosa).

Flamengo participated in the FIFA Club World Cup for the first time in the club's history in 2019 in Qatar. The club defeated Al Hilal SFC 3–1 in the semi-final, but lost 0–1 to Liverpool in the final.

After winning the revived Supercopa do Brasil against Athletico Paranaense, then the Recopa Sudamericana against Copa Sudamericana champions Independiente del Valle, and the 2020 Campeonato Carioca, in July 2020 Jorge Jesus departed from Flamengo to return to Benfica, having won five titles in Brazil. Jesus's successor was former Pep Guardiola assistant Domènec Torrent, but his tenure was brief and he was replaced with Rogério Ceni in November 2020. Ceni led Flamengo to a second consecutive Campeonato Brasileiro championship, finishing one point ahead of Internacional.

In 2021 Ceni led Flamengo to a third consecutive Campeonato Carioca, but was released after four losses in Flamengo's first ten Campeonato Brasileiro Série A matches. The club signed Renato Gaúcho as manager, who brought strong results in league play and took Flamengo back to the Copa Libertadores Final against Palmeiras, but lost 2–1 in extra time. He and the club parted ways after.

In 2022, after a difficult start to the year under manager Paulo Sousa (runners-up in the Campeonato Carioca and Supercopa do Brasil), Dorival Júnior returned to Flamengo and brought another wave of glory. The team advanced to the finals of the Copa do Brasil against Corinthians. In the second leg in the Maracanã, tied 1–1 on aggregate, Flamengo were victorious in the penalty shootout with Rodinei scoring the winner. This was Flamengo's fourth Copa do Brasil championship and first since 2013. Later that month on 29 October 2022, Flamengo faced Athletico Paranaense in Guayaquil, Ecuador for the final of the Copa Libertadores. Gabriel Barbosa scored the only goal of the match and Flamengo claimed their second Copa Libertadores in four years, and third overall.

Team image

Crest 
Flamengo's crest has changed slightly throughout the club's history. Most of the changes has been changes to the interlocked letters monogram, with the latest redesign being unveiled in 2018.

The club uses three crests in different situations: the full crest is used as the club's official logo, the rowing crest is used for all rowing related uniforms and equipment, and the white "CRF" monogram is typically the only component of the crest worn on the primary football uniform. It remarkably resembles the "RFC" monogram traditionally used by Scottish club Rangers F. C..

Beginning in 1980, Flamengo wore three white stars aligned vertically along the side of their monogram crest to indicate their three state league tri-championships (1942–43–44, 1953–54–55, and 1978–79–79 Special). When Nike became Flamengo's kit provider in 2000, their first kit featured the full shield crest with three stars above it for the first time. After the fourth state league tri-championship (1999-2000-2001) and to commemorate the 20th anniversary of the 1981 Copa Libertadores and Intercontinental Cup championships, a fourth white star and a gold star were introduced above the crest. Since 2005 the club uses only the gold star above the "CRF" monogram crest on their shirts.

Uniforms 

At the 1895 meeting which established the Flamengo rowing club, the club's official colors were decided as blue and gold to symbolized the sky of Rio de Janeiro and the riches of Brazil. The team adopted a uniform of thick blue and gold horizontal stripes. However Flamengo failed to win a single regatta in their first year and gained the nickname of "bronze club." The team colors were perceived as bad luck, and the colored fabric was expensive to import from England. One year after the club's establishment, the official colors were replaced with the current red and black.

In 1912, at the request of the Flamengo rowing team (who opposed the use of their same uniform by the newly established football team), the football players dressed in shirts divided into red and black quarters which became known as the papagaio de vintém uniform, named after a particular style of kite. However the shirt became synonymous with bad luck and was replaced in 1913 by a shirt with red and black horizontal stripes and thinner white bands. This uniform was nicknamed the cobra coral due to its similarity to the pattern of a coral snake. This was the uniform worn when Flamengo won their first Campeonato Carioca title in 1914. The white bands were removed from the shirt in 1916 as the pattern was very similar to the flag of Germany at the time, who Brazil was allied against in World War I. The rowing team permitted the football team to use their same uniform, and Flamengo's traditional football uniform of a red and black striped shirt, white shorts and red-black socks was born.

In 1938, Flamengo manager Dori Kruschner suggested the creation of a secondary white uniform to "improve the visibility in night matches." The new uniform was approved by the club, and Flamengo became a pioneer of secondary uniforms in Brazil. The white shirt had two red and black stripes across the chest until 1979 when it was changed to a plain white chest with stripes on the sleeves. This was the shirt worn by the team that won the 1981 Intercontinental Cup.

Beginning in the 1990s the club began to experiment with their second and third alternative uniforms, sometimes wearing all black or all red shirts. In 1995 for the club's centenary, a "papagaio de vintém" shirt was worn in friendlies. In 2010 uniform supplier Olympikus introduced a blue and gold alternative uniform which paid homage to Flamengo's original colors and regatta uniform, however it was not well received by fans who likened it to the uniform worn by the fictional satirical team "Tabajara" on the popular comedy program Casseta & Planeta Urgente. In the first half of the 2009 season, the team wore a uniform without sponsorship for the first time in 25 years. Flamengo have continued to traditionally wear red and black striped shirts with white shorts as their primary uniform.

Kit suppliers and shirt sponsors 
The following is a list of Flamengo's sponsors and uniform suppliers.

Uniform deals

Stadiums

Rua Paysandu 
Flamengo's first official home ground was the Estádio da Rua Paysandu ("Paysandu Street Stadium"). The ground formerly belonged to Paissandu Atlético Clube before they ceased playing football in 1914. The owners of the ground rented the field to Flamengo where they played their home matches from 1915 to 1932. Between 1912 and 1915 (and later between 1932 and 1938), the club played all their matches on the grounds of Botafogo or Fluminense. The first Flamengo match at Rua Paysandu was played on October 31, 1915, in the Campeonato Carioca against Bangu. Crowds of 15,000 watched Flamengo face Fluminese at the park in 1918 and 1919.

Estádio da Gávea 

Flamengo's home stadium is nominally the Estádio da Gávea (officially named the Estádio José Bastos Padilha at Flamengo's Gávea Headquarters), which was inaugurated on September 4, 1938, and has a capacity of 4,000 people. The stadium is named after José Bastos Padilha, Flamengo's president at the time of the stadium's construction, from 1933 to 1937. Even though Flamengo no longer play their matches at Gávea, the site serves as the club's administrative headquarters. Since the 1990s, the stadium has been used almost exclusively for the club's youth and women's teams' matches, and as the training ground for the senior team. Most matches are played at the significantly larger Maracanã Stadium, considered by supporters as the real Flamengo home ground. Gávea Stadium is not actually located in the neighborhood of Gávea but rather in Leblon.

During the 2014 FIFA World Cup, the Dutch National Team used the Estádio da Gávea and all of its facilities as their training ground in preparation for the competition.

Maracanã 

Since its construction for the 1950 World Cup, the Maracanã has primarily served as the home ground for the four biggest Rio de Janeiro clubs. The stadium was officially completed in 1965, 17 years after construction began. In 1963, more than 194,000 people attended a match between Flamengo and Fluminense at the Maracanã. The capacity of the stadium allowed Flamengo to have the largest support of any clubs in Brazil for much of the 20th century. In 1989 Zico scored his final goal in the historic stadium, setting the current unbroken record for goals in the Maracanã at 333. An upper stand in the stadium collapsed on July 19, 1992, in the second match of the finals of 1992 Campeonato Brasileiro Série A between Botafogo and Flamengo, leading to the death of three spectators and injuring 50 others. Following the disaster, the stadium's capacity was greatly reduced as it was converted to an all-seater stadium in the late 1990s. Following its 50th anniversary in 2000, the stadium underwent renovations which would increase its full capacity to around 103,000. After years of planning and nine months of closure between 2005 and 2006 (during which Flamengo played their home matches at Volta Redonda's Estádio Raulino de Oliveira and Portuguesa's Estádio Luso Brasileiro), the stadium was reopened in January 2007 with an all-seated capacity of 87,000. For the 2014 World Cup and 2016 Olympics and Paralympics, a major reconstruction project was initiated in 2010. The original seating bowl, with a two-tier configuration, was demolished, giving way to a new one-tier seating bowl.

The stadium is officially under the management of Brazilian conglomerate Odebrecht as of 2013. This has resulted in unfavorable rental agreements for Flamengo who do not officially administer the stadium and often owe rental fees for matches in excess of their ticket revenue, even for matches with high attendance. The most recent rental agreement was signed in 2018 and is valid through 2020. In April 2019, Flamengo and Fluminense came to an agreement with the state and the operators of the Maracanã to serve as joint-managers of the venue for the following six months, a deal which allowed the clubs to pay a fixed monthly fee and receive a higher share of matchday revenue than was granted under the previous deal.

Ilha do Urubu 

In 2017, Flamengo played their home matches at the Estádio Luso Brasileiro of Portuguesa while disputing their stadium situation with the Rio de Janeiro state government and Complexo Maracanã Entretenimento S.A. (composed of Odebrecht, IMX, AEG), the operator of the Maracanã Stadium. A three-year agreement was signed with Portuguesa over management of Estádio Luso Brasileiro, named Ilha do Urubu ("Vulture's Island") by Flamengo supporters in a poll. The park was renovated to fit 20,500 spectators. Flamengo started playing at the arena in March 2017, but after several delays and administrative issues and a new contract with the Maracanã, Flamengo broke their lease with the Ilha do Urubu in July 2018.

Rivalries

Rivalry with Vasco da Gama 

The Clássico dos Milhões (English: "Derby of Millions") is the traditional Brazilian derby between Flamengo and Vasco da Gama, both from Rio de Janeiro. It is considered one of the biggest rivalries in Brazilian football and in football worldwide. The derby's name originated in the 1920s and refers to the two largest fanbases in the state of Rio de Janeiro. Both clubs were established in the late 19th century as regatta rowing clubs. The first football match between the clubs was played in 1923 when Vasco entered the top division of the Campeonato Carioca. From the 1972 to 2001, the matchup was elevated as the most important of Flamengo's rivalries (surpassing Fluminense) and became one of the biggest rivalries in all of Brazil. In this span, Flamengo and Vasco played in or won the final of each of the phases of the state championship nearly every year, frequently facing one another. This also coincided with the beginnings of the national Campeonato Brasileiro and the growth in popularity of both clubs nationwide. The most iconic matches between Flamengo and Vasco featured the idols of both clubs challenging each other: Zico of Flamengo (1971–83; 85–89) and Roberto Dinamite of Vasco da Gama (1971–79; 80–93).

Rivalry with Fluminense 

The rivalry between these two clubs began in October 1911 when a group of dissatisfied players from Fluminense left their club and joined Flamengo, establishing the football department at their new club. The first Fla–Flu ever was played the following year on July 7. Fluminense won the match 3–2, with 800 people in attendance. Flamengo and Fluminense are the two most successful team in the Campeonato Carioca: as of 2022 Flamengo have 37 state league titles and Fluminense have 32. In 1963, the Maracanã held 194,603 spectators to watch the Fla-Flu match.

Rivalry with Botafogo 
The first confrontation between Rio de Janeiro rivals Flamengo and Botafogo occurred in 1913. The match became known as the Clássico da Rivaldade (English: "Rivalry Classic") in the 1960s. Flamengo's mascot of the vulture originated during the June 1, 1969, match against Botafogo when Flamengo supporters released a vulture onto the field in response to the racist cheers of urubu (vulture) from Botafogo and other teams' supporters. Flamengo's top scorer in the derby is Zico and Botafogo's top scorer is Heleno de Freitas.

Rivalry with Atlético Mineiro 

Flamengo has an inter-state rivalry with Atlético Mineiro of Minas Gerais, developed in the 1980s from numerous controversial encounters between the two clubs in that decade's Campeonato Brasileiro and Copa Libertadores editions. It maintained its high intensity through the following years, and is considered one of the biggest interstate rivalries in Brazilian football.

Scarlet-Black Nation 

Since the early 1990s, surveys have shown that Flamengo is consistently the most supported club in Brazil with an estimated more than 40 million fans.  In a 2019 survey, 20 percent of adult football fans in Brazil consider themselves supporters of Flamengo, with high levels of support in all states of the country,  including the North and Northeast regions, in addition to Rio de Janeiro. Flamengo supporters are known as Nação Rubro-Negra (en: Scarlet-Black Nation).

The first organized supporters group in all of Brazil, Charanga Rubro-Negra (Scarlet-Black Charanga Band), was founded in support of Flamengo in 1942. Since then, a large number of additional organized supporters groups have formed around Flamengo, notably Torcida Jovem-Fla (Young-Fla), Urubuzada (Vultures), Flamanguaça (FlaBooze), and Raça Rubro-Negra (Scarlet-Black Race).

In 2007 Flamengo supporters were declared as part of the cultural heritage of the city of Rio de Janeiro, along with bossa nova and Bola Preta, the oldest Carnival block in Rio.

In the 1983 Campeonato Brasileiro Série A final, Flamengo played against Santos in the Maracanã in front of an official crowd of 155,523 with some estimates of over 160,000 people in attendance.

The largest attendance for a football match in the world's history was the derby between Flamengo and Fluminense in 1963, with 194,603 spectators. Flamengo matches in the Maracanã have broken the 150,000 attendance mark thirteen times.

In July 2020, their YouTube channel FLATV passed Liverpool FC as the club with the third most subscriptions for a soccer channel only behind Barcelona and Real Madrid. Flamengo's channel reached over 5 million subscriptions.

Mascot 

Flamengo's first mascot was Popeye the Sailor Man, a comic book and cartoon character in the 1940s. The idea for the mascot came from Argentine cartoonist Lorenzo Molas, who saw in Popeye the strength and persistence of Flamengo, in addition to its obvious connection with the sea. However, such a mascot was never very popular among the club's supporters.

In the 1960s, rival fans began to call Flamengo fans urubus (English: "vultures"), a racist allusion to the large mass of Afro-descendant and poor Scarlet-Black supporters. Such an offensive nickname was never well received by Flamengo fans, until May 31, 1969. It was on a Sunday, when a Scarlet-Black fan decided to take the bird to a game between Flamengo and Botafogo at Maracanã. At the time, the two clubs were playing the classic with the greatest post-Garrincha rivalry. And Flamengo hadn't beaten the rival for four years. In the stands, Botafogo fans shouted, as always, that Flamengo was a urubu team.

The vulture was released in the stands with a flag stuck to its feet and, when it fell on the lawn, just before the game started, the crowd cheered and shouted: É urubu, é urubu. (English: "it's a vulture, it's a vulture"). Flamengo won the game 2-1 and, from there, the new mascot was consecrated, taking Popeye's place. The cartoonist Henfil, Scarlet-Black, tried to humanize him in his sports cartoons in newspapers and magazines, and the Urubu became a popular mascot.

In 2000, Flamengo's mascot received an official design and a name: Samuca. However, this name did not become popular among the supporters, who continue to call him simply Urubu.

On May 25, 2008, Uruba and Urubinha debuted at Maracanã in a match between Flamengo and Internacional, valid for the 2008 Campeonato Brasileiro Série A. Since then, they have been present in several Flamengo games and events.

Anthem 
Flamengo has two anthems: the official one, called Hymno Rubro-Negro (English: "Scarlet-Black Anthem"), which was created in 1920 with lyrics and music by Paulo Magalhães (former goalkeeper of the club), recorded in 1932 by singer Castro Barbosa and registered in 1937 at the Instituto Nacional de Música, with the refrain "Flamengo! Flamengo! Tua glória é lutar, Flamengo! Flamengo! Campeão de terra e mar" (in English: "Flamengo! Flamengo! Your glory is to fight, Flamengo! Flamengo! Champion of land and sea"); and the popular one, with lyrics and music by Lamartine Babo, recorded for the first time by Gilberto Alves in 1945. The latter is the best known and the one that sings the glories of the club, whose refrain is "Uma vez Flamengo, sempre Flamengo" (English: "Once you are Flamengo, always Flamengo").

Players

First team squad

Out on loan

Youth players with first team numbers

Other players under contract

Retired numbers

12 –  Club Supporters (the 12th Man) – Number dedicated to the rubro-negro fans.(*)

(*) In spite of having its number "12" retired, Flamengo has to re-issue it for CONMEBOL competitions such as Copa Libertadores, where rosters must be numbered from 1 to 50 consecutively.

Staff

Current staff

Football honours

 
  shared record

Records

CONMEBOL club coefficient ranking

Average attendance
Below is Flamengo's average home match average attendance in Campeonato Brasileiro league matches since the current league format was adopted in 2003.

Domestic results
Below are Flamengo's results in domestic competitions since the previous nationwide organized competitions (1959), before the first official Brazilian national championship tournament in 1971.

International results
Below are Flamengo's results in official international competitions since the club's first qualification to the Copa Libertadores in 1981. Group stage match results are listed with the home match first.

(H) – Home ; (A) – Away; (N) – Neutral

Current board of directors

Other sports

Men's basketball 

Flamengo basketball won the Rio de Janeiro City Championship in 1919 and have since grown to be one of the most successful and supported basketball teams in the country. The club have won six Brazilian Championships, a record 44 Rio de Janeiro State Championships, the 1953 South American Championship of Champions Clubs, and the 2009 South American League.

In 2014, Flamengo won the League of the Americas without a single loss, defeating Pinheiros in the final. This qualified Flamengo to their first Intercontinental Cup against EuroLeague champions Maccabi Tel Aviv. Flamengo won and became the second Brazilian basketball team in history to be world champions. Flamengo, Real Madrid and Barcelona are the only clubs to have won the Intercontinental Cups in both football and basketball.

Flamengo hosted and participated in the 2019 FIBA Intercontinental Cup, falling to BCL champions AEK Athens in the final.

Honours
Novo Basquete Brasil (NBB): 7
 2009, 2012–13, 2013–14, 2014–15, 2015–16, 2018–19, 2020–21

Copa Super 8: 2
 2018, 2020–21

Campeonato Brasileiro de Basquete: 1
 2008

Basketball Champions League Americas: 1
 2020–21

FIBA Americas League: 1
 2014

FIBA Intercontinental Cup: 2
 2014, 2022

Women's football 

Between 1995 and 2001, the Flamengo women's football team competed in the Campeonato Carioca. In 2002 the women's Carioca tournament was not organized, and the club ceased operation of the team. Flamengo attempted to re-established their women's professional football department in 2011 through a partnership with the city of Guarujá where the team trained and hoped to sign Marta, but the team never materialized. In 2015 president Eduardo Bandeira de Mello succeeded in establishing the football team through a partnership with the Brazilian Navy. In their first season, the team won the women's Campeonato Carioca state championship and have won it every season from 2015 to 2019. In 2016 Flamengo won the Campeonato Brasileiro de Futebol Feminino for the first time against Rio Preto, become the only club outside the state of São Paulo to win the tournament since its creation in 2013. Flamengo also competed in the 2016 and 2017 Copa do Brasil de Futebol Feminino before the cancellation of the competition in favor of the Campeonato Brasileiro.

Honors 

 Campeonato Brasileiro de Futebol Feminino: 1
 2016

 Campeonato Carioca de Futebol Feminino: 5
 2015, 2016, 2017, 2018, 2019

Women's basketball 
The Flamengo women's basketball team won back-to-back Brazilian championships in 1954 and 1955. Ten years later with some of the same players, the program won back-to-back Brazilian titles again in 1964 and 1965. Flamengo players Norminha, Angelina, Marlene and Delei were champions of the 1967 Pan American Games in Winnipeg with the Brazil women's national basketball team.

In 1966 Flamengo won the Inter-club Basketball World Championship. The team was led by Angelina, considered one of the best players of her time.

Rowing 

The "Flamengo Regatta Group", later renamed the "Flamengo Regatta Club", was established in 1895 as Flamengo's first ever organized athletic department, forming the basis of the club's history and identity to this day. The first regatta victory came in 1898 in the Nautical Championship of Brazil, and the first title was won in 1900, the Regatta of the IV Centenary of the Discovery of Brazil, for which the club was awarded the Jug Tropon trophy. In 1905 the club won a classic event, the South American Cup. By 1908, Flamengo had already won 43 gold, 126 silver and 141 bronze medals. The success of the rowing club made the team famous even before the founding of the football department in 1911. Great rowers such as Everardo Paes de Lima, Arnaldo Voigt, Alfredo Correia ("Boca Larga"), Ângelo Gammaro ("Angelú") and Antônio Rebello Junior ("Engole Garfo") came through Flamengo, the latter three being considered Brazilian sports heroes for completing the Rio-Santos crossing in 1932.

From 1931 to 1937 Flamengo were seven-time champions of Rio de Janeiro, and were four-time repeat state champions from 1940 to 1943. In 1963 the "Buck era" began, which revolutionized Flamengo rowing. The coach brought in athletes from other states and renovated the club's facilities to better accommodate the boats. Buck coached the Brazil national team, directing the team in several international competitions. In the early 1980s, Flamengo won the state championship and won again in 1992. The club has won the men's Brazil Trophy 10 times, and the female once, in addition to 45 Carioca state titles.

Water polo 
Water polo is the second oldest sport practiced by the club, after rowing. The team played their first game on May 27, 1913, in Rio de Janeiro, and defeated Clube Internacional de Regatas, 3–2. Flamengo only opened its water sports facility in 1965. Prior to that, athletes played and trained in the Rodrigo de Freitas Lagoon or in the sea. Flamengo's first polo championship in Rio de Janeiro came in 1985 and was the start of a run of nine consecutive championships through 1993. In 1985 the club won the South American Club Championship and the Brazil Trophy (also won four consecutive times). A female water polo team was established in 1987, winning the Brazil Trophy in 1987 and 1991 and the state championship in 1995.

American football 
The club launched their American football team in 2013, forming a partnership with the Rio de Janeiro Emperors. The Emperors were established in 2008 and had previously partnered with Fluminense from 2010 to 2013. The team officially goes by the name of the Flamengo Emperors and compete in the BFA (Brasil Futebol Americano).

Tennis 
Flamengo began playing tennis championships in 1916 and became three-time Rio champions soon after (1916–18), even with their athletes training at other clubs. Until 1932 the club practiced tennis on their football field at the Rua Paysandu. In 1963 the club inaugurated their own facilities and courts. The biggest idol of Flamengo's tennis department is Thomas Koch.

E-sports 

In 2017 the club announced they would be entering the increasingly popular e-sports leagues the following year, beginning with a League of Legends department and eventually establishing a PES team. Because the competitive League of Legends center of Brazil is at the Riot Games studio in São Paulo, Flamengo established a permanent "gaming office" for the team in the city. Flamengo announced that they would not be partnering with an existing team but rather would have their own team. In October 2017 they announced the purchase of Merciless Gaming, a team in the second division of the Brazilian League of Legends championship.

Additional sports departments 
 Artistic gymnastics
 Auto racing (Flamengo Superleague Formula team)
 Beach soccer
 Bocce
 CP football
 Futsal
 Indoor soccer
 Judo
 Swimming
 Synchronized swimming
 Volleyball

See also
Clássico dos Milhões
Fla-Flu

Notes

References

External links

  
 

 
1895 establishments in Brazil
Association football clubs established in 1895
Football clubs in Rio de Janeiro (city)
Unrelegated association football clubs
Multi-sport clubs in Brazil
Copa Libertadores winning clubs
Copa Mercosur winning clubs
Recopa Sudamericana winning clubs
Intercontinental Cup winning clubs
Copa do Brasil winning clubs
Campeonato Brasileiro Série A winning clubs
Football clubs in Rio de Janeiro (state)